Behice Hanım ("Happy"; born Behiye Maan; 10 October 1882 – 22 October 1969; after the Surname Law of 1934: Behice Maan) was a consort of Sultan Abdul Hamid II of the Ottoman Empire.

Early life
Behice Hanım was born on 10 October 1882 in Beynevid, Adapazarı, Sakarya Province. Born as Behiye Maan, she was a member of Abkhazian noble family, Maan. Her father was Albus Bey Maan, the grandson of Kats Bey Maan. Her mother was Nazli Hanım Kucba, an Abkhazian, daughter of Hacı Kuç Pasha. She had one brother, Rauf Bey, and four sisters, Atiye Hanım, Tasvire Hanım, Ihsan Hanım, and Nimet Hanım. She was the first cousin of Sazkar Hanım, one of other consort of Sultan Abdul Hamid II. She was also related to the wife of Halil Kut Pasha. She was beautiful, tall and blonde, with blue eyes. She was very proud and arrogant.

Marriage
Behiye's father learned that Abdul Hamid was looking for a bride for his son, Şehzade Mehmed Burhaneddin, and hence, in 1899 brought her to the court, and presented her to the Sultan. However, Abdul Hamid was so taken by the beauty of the young girl that he asked her hand in marriage for himself. Her father gave permission even though Behiye was against it. The marriage took place on 10 May 1900 in the Hünkar Kiosk of the Yıldız Palace. Behice was eighteen, while Abdul Hamid was fifty-eight. She was given the title of "Fifth Ikbal" and the name Behice.

A year after the marriage, on 22 June 1901, she gave birth to twins, Şehzade Ahmed Nureddin and Şehzade Mehmed Badreddin. Badreddin died at the age of two on 13 October 1903 because meningitis.

On 27 April 1909, Abdul Hamid was deposed, and sent into exile in Thessaloniki. She didn't follow him, and instead remained in Istanbul. She settled with her son in Maslak Palace. After Thessaloniki fell to Greece in 1912, Abdul Hamid returned to Istanbul, and settled in the Beylerbeyi Palace, where he died in 1918.

Last years and death
In 1924, the imperial family was sent into exile. Behice went to Naples with her son, where they lived in Via Generale Orsini. Her son later moved to Paris, leaving her here, where he died in 1945. After her son's death, life for her became difficult. She fell on hard times in Naples because she had no money and what she was sent from Turkey was being embezzled by her servant. A relative who visited her in Italy in 1969 was appalled by the conditions she lived in: her hair was unkempt, her nails had grown extremely long and she had not washed herself in weeks. In March 1969, she was reported in Istanbul by her family, where she died seven months later, on 22 October 1969 at the age of eighty-seven. She was buried in Yahya Efendi Cemetery, Istanbul.

Issue

Ancestry

See also
Ikbal (title)
Ottoman Imperial Harem
List of consorts of the Ottoman sultans

References

Sources

20th-century consorts of Ottoman sultans
1882 births
1969 deaths
People from Batumi
People from the Ottoman Empire of Abkhazian descent
Abdul Hamid II